Nicklas Utgren (born 12 January 1969), is a former professional tennis player from Sweden. He enjoyed most of his tennis success while playing doubles. During his career he won 1 doubles title. He achieved a career-high doubles ranking of world No. 55 in 1990. He ended his career when he was 27 years old.

Career finals

Doubles (1 win, 2 losses)

External links
 
 

Swedish male tennis players
Tennis players from Stockholm
1969 births
Living people